A lower (uterine) segment Caesarean section (LSCS) is the most commonly used type of Caesarean section. Most commonly to deliver the baby a transverse incision is made in the lower uterine segment above the attachment of the urinary bladder to the uterus. This type of incision results in less blood loss and is easier to repair than other types of Caesarean sections.

Method
A vertical incision in the lower uterine segment may be performed in the following circumstances:
 presence of lateral varicosities
 constriction ring to cut through it
 deeply engaged head
The location of an LSCS is beneficial for the following reasons:
 peritoneum is more loosely attached to the uterus
 contraction is less than in upper part of uterus
 healing is more efficient
 sutures are intact (less problem with suture loosening)
Most bleeding takes place from the angles of the incision, and forceps can be applied to control it. Green Armytage forceps are specifically designed for this purpose.

Although the incision is made using a sharp scalpel, care must be taken not to injure the foetus, especially if the membranes are ruptured, or in emergencies like abruption. The incision can be extended to either sides using a scissor or by blunt dissection using hands. While using the scissors, the surgeon should ensure that a finger is placed underneath the uterus so that the foetus in protected from unintentional injury. If blunt dissection is done, intraoperative blood loss can be minimized. In cases where Pfannenstiel incision cannot be done (such as large baby), Kronig incision (low vertical incision), classical (midline), J or T shaped incisions may be used to incise the uterus.

Etymology and history
The German gynecologist Hermann Johannes Pfannenstiel (1862–1909) invented the technique. In the United Kingdom, the surgery was first popularised by Dr. Monroe Kerr, who first used it in 1911, so in English speaking countries it is sometimes called the Kerr incision or the Pfannenstiel-Kerr incision. Kerr published the results in 1920, proposing that this method would cause less damage to the vascularized areas of uterus than the classical operation. He claimed that it was better than the longitudinal uterine incision in terms of chances for scar rupture and injury to vessels.

References

Further reading
 Lower segment Caesarean section Primary Surgery: Volume One: Non-trauma. Prev. Chapter 10. The surgery of labour

Obstetric surgery
Caesarean sections